Andrea Gaveglia (born 12 April 1984) is an Italian footballer who played in Serie B for Napoli, Martina and Avellino.

Biography
Gaveglia was a youth product of S.S.C. Napoli. In January 2003 he was sold to Messina in co-ownership deal along with Pietro De Giorgio for a total fee of €26,000. In June 2008 he became a free agent after Messina was relegated to Serie D. Gaveglia and teammate Antonio Ghomsi were signed by U.S. Avellino on free transfer.

After the bankruptcy of  Colligiana Gaveglia without a club for 6 months. In January 2011 he joined Andria.

References

External links

1984 births
Living people
Italian footballers
S.S.C. Napoli players
A.C.R. Messina players
U.S. Avellino 1912 players
Footballers from Naples
S.S.C. Giugliano players
A.S.D. Martina Calcio 1947 players
A.S.D. Olimpia Colligiana players
S.S. Fidelis Andria 1928 players
S.S. Ebolitana 1925 players
Association football defenders